Drot og marsk (King and Marshal) is an opera by the Danish composer Peter Heise. The libretto, by Christian Richardt, is based on Carsten Hauch's play Marsk Stig (1850). The opera was first performed at the Royal Theatre, Copenhagen, on 25 September 1878.

Roles

Synopsis
The opera is based on the true story of the murder of the Danish king Eric Glipping in 1286. The king is an inveterate womaniser and when he seduces Ingeborg, the wife of Marshal Stig, the marshal organises a conspiracy to kill him. Stig is banished and Ingeborg commits suicide.

Recordings
Drot og marsk, Poul Elming, Bent Norup, Eva Johansson, Aage Haugland, Danish National Radio Choir and Royal Symphony Orchestra, conducted by Michael Schønwaldt (Chandos)

Gallery

Sources
The Viking Opera Guide ed. Holden (Viking, 1993)
The Penguin Guide to Opera on Compact Discs (1993)

External links

 Source useful for expansion of the article

Peter Arnold Heise
Danish-language operas
1878 operas
Operas by Peter Heise
Operas
Operas based on plays
Operas set in the 13th century
Operas based on real people
Operas set in Denmark
Danish Culture Canon